One Mission Society (formerly known as Oriental Missionary Society and OMS International) is an Evangelical Christian missionary society which was founded in 1901 by Charles, Lettie Cowman, Juji Nakada, and Ernest A. Kilbourne. It is currently operating in 78 countries and is based in Greenwood, Indiana.

Founding
OMS was founded in a storefront building in Tokyo, Japan. In 1901, American missionaries Charles and Lettie Cowman partnered with a Japanese pastor, Juji Nakada, holding Christian evangelistic meetings for 2,000 consecutive nights. Japanese churches were organized, and the new association, the Japan Holiness Church (JHC), grew rapidly.  Not long after their arrival in 1902, their family was joined by that of Charles' former co-worker, first conversion, and best friend, Ernest Kilbourne.

Founders

Charles Cowman 
Born on March 13, 1868, Charles E. Cowman grew up in the church. At 15, he left home for a job in telegraphing. He met and married Lettie Cowman when she was 19 and he, 21.

After living in Colorado for one year of marriage, they spent the next ten years in Chicago where Charles continued his work in telegraphy. In 1894 that Charles began his work as a missionary, preaching to coworkers.

The Cowmans moved to Japan in 1901 to partner with Juji Nakada.

Lettie Cowman  
Born on March 3, 1870, Lettie B. Cowman met her future husband for the first time when she was a baby, and met again as teenagers. 

In later life, Lettie wrote Streams in the Desert about the hardships she experienced, specifically when Charles' health was rapidly declining. 

She died in 1960 on April 17, at the age of 87.

Juji Nakada  
Born on October 29, 1870, Juji Nakada was a rebellious youth. His decision to enter missionary work was influenced by a life-long mentor, Reverend Yoichi Honda. Nakada went to America, to attend the Moody Bible Institute in Chicago. He returned to Japan as an evangelist. Cowman, who had chosen to help financially support Nakada, received news of Nakada's participation in several mass conversions.

Cowman and Nakada together established the Tokyo Bible Institute, with Nakada to serve as the first president. The institute was used for classes during the day and evangelism in the evenings.

An OMS-published book No Guarantee but God states of Nakada, "It was not surprising that he was sometimes charged with being domineering, even dictatorial. But by the great majority of Christians, both laymen and clergy, he was held in respect that approached awe."

Nakada died on September 24, 1939.

Ernest A. Kilbourne  
Ernest A. Kilbourne was born on March 13, 1865, in Ontario. Kilbourne was brought up in a Methodist home, but after moving to the United States while still in his teens to work for the Western Union, his religious upbringing was quickly forgotten. He moved to New York at age 21. After living in New York he traveled to Australia, Europe, and New Zealand, settling for a very short time into a job as a telegraph operator in Nevada. He met his future wife, Julia Pittinger. Soon after they were married, Kilbourne transferred to the Chicago office where he met Charles Cowman, who was responsible for his conversion.

In 1902, he went to Japan with his family to continue the work that had been started by the Cowmans and Nakada.

When Cowman died, he became the second president of the organization. Kilbourne died in 1928.

Electric Messages  
In November 1902, Kilbourne started Electric Messages, a monthly periodical that detailed what they were accomplishing and encouraged others to donate to the cause. This was later called The O.M.S. Standard before being changed to its current name, OMS Outreach. Lettie Cowman was the active writer for these publications for many years.

The Great Village Campaign  
The OMS founders began the Great Village Campaign in 1913. The goal was to reach every person in Japan with the Gospel in five years. When the campaign was completed in 1918, the Cowmans were in America due to Charles' health issues.

After regaining his health, Cowman traveled to promote The Great Village Campaign, but his health forced him to stop traveling. He spent his final years in physical pain, as explained in Lettie Cowman's Streams in the Desert. In early 1924 he signed over the OMS bank books to Kilbourne and a businessman named Clark.

Expansion  
In the last 100 years, OMS began work in approximately 77 countries, including Japan, Taiwan, Romania, Spain, Colombia, Haiti, Israel and Canada.

Today OMS partners with 180+ denominations and organizations.

One Mission Society seeks to fulfill their mission through intentional evangelism, church planting, training of leaders, and forming strategic partnerships. More than 6,000 churches are planted every year, with the help of 14,000+ indigenous coworkers in 45 languages.

References

External links 
 One Mission Society 
Ref 1
Ref 2
Ref 3
Ref 4
Ref 5

Christian missionary societies
Christian organizations established in the 20th century
Christian organizations established in 1901

zh:遠東傳教會